Mikhail Golubev (born 30 May 1970, Odessa) is a Ukrainian chess Grandmaster (1996), journalist and author.

Chess career
Golubev began playing chess at the age of six and played his first tournament a year later in 1977. He played several times in Ukrainian Chess Championship, and shared first place (with Valery Neverov) at Yalta 1996 (declared winner on better tie-breaks). In 2008, he won the Odessa Region Open Championship.

Other successful performances include first place at Karviná 1992-93, first at Bucharest 2002, and first at Béthune 2002.

Chess strength
According to the website Chessmetrics, at his peak in January 1995 Golubev's play was equivalent to a rating of 2598, and he was ranked number 151 in the world. His best single performance was at Biel open, 1995, where he scored 4 of 6 possible points (67%) against 2605-rated opposition, for a performance rating of 2643.

According to the database Mega Database 2009, his best performances were Bethune 2002 (6,5 points on 7 possible and a 2768 performance), Karvina 1992–93 (8 points on 9 possible and a 2691 performance), Yalta 1996 (8,5 points on 11 possible and a 2663 performance) and Berlin 1993 (7 points on 9 possible and a 2662 performance).

In the November 2009 FIDE list, he has an Elo rating of 2492, making him Ukraine's number 71.

Notable games
Vlatko Bogdanovski vs Mikhail Golubev, Skopje 1991, King's Indian Defense: Orthodox Variation (A46), 0-1
Mikhail Golubev vs Renzo Mantovani, Biel Open 1992, Sicilian Defense: Fischer-Sozin Attack (B87), 1-0
Mikhail Golubev vs Emil Sutovsky, Groningen GM open 1993, Sicilian Defense: Exchange Variation (B45), 1-0
Mikhail Golubev vs Vladimir Podinic, Lasker Autumn GM 2001, Sicilian Defense: Paulsen (B48), 1-0

Photos

Books

Journalism
Golubev is as much a chess journalist as an author. In addition to being chess observer for the Ukrainian newspaper Komanda and making contributions to ChessBase.com, Chesspro and Chess-News.ru, he has contributed to over a 1000 editions of the online daily chess newspaper Chess Today.

References

External links
 Mikhail Golubev's Chess Page

Mikhail Golubev at 365Chess.com
Chessmetrics Player Profile: Mihail Golubev

Mikhail Golubev - Products - New In Chess
LatestChess - Interview with GM Mikhail Golubev

1970 births
Living people
Sportspeople from Odesa
Chess grandmasters
Ukrainian chess players
Ukrainian chess writers